Ucuncha District is one of six districts of the province of Bolívar in Peru.

References